Mohammad Ahmadi (born 9 January 2000) is a Swedish footballer who plays as a defender for Falkenbergs FF in Allsvenskan.

Club career
Ahmadi made his Allsvenskan debut for Falkenbergs FF on 19 July 2020 against Helsingborgs IF.

References

External links 

2000 births
Living people
Swedish footballers
Iranian footballers
Swedish people of Iranian descent
Sportspeople of Iranian descent
Association football defenders
Falkenbergs FF players
Allsvenskan players
People from Falkenberg
Sportspeople from Halland County